The 2015 Champions Tour was the 36th season for the golf tour now known as PGA Tour Champions since it officially began in 1980 as the Senior PGA Tour. The season was to have had 26 official money events, including five majors, but the PGA Tour removed two September events during the season, reducing it to 24 events. Jeff Maggert won the most tournaments, four, including two majors, while Bernhard Langer led the money list, scoring average list and the Charles Schwab Cup.

It also proved to be the final year for the tour under the "Champions Tour" name; the PGA Tour rebranded the circuit as "PGA Tour Champions" after this season.

Tournament results
The following table shows all the official money events for the 2015 season. "Date" is the ending date of the tournament. The numbers in parentheses after the winners' names are the number of wins they have on the tour up to and including that event. Senior majors are shown in bold.

On April 24, the Quebec Championship, scheduled for September 4–6, was removed for logistical reasons. On August 25, the PGA Tour removed the Pacific Links China Championship, scheduled for September 18–20 at the 27 Club after the Port of Tianjin container explosions taking place less than a month from the tournament's date.

Leaders
Scoring Average leaders

Source:

Money List leaders

Source:

Career Money List leaders

Source:

Awards

See also
Champions Tour awards
Champions Tour records

References

External links
PGA Tour Champions official site

PGA Tour Champions seasons
Champions Tour